Baram may refer to

Places

India
Baram, Meerut a village in India

Iran
Baram Seh, a village in Iran

Malaysia
Baram Dam, a dam in Malaysia
Baram District, a district of Sarawak, Malaysia
Baram (federal constituency), represented in the Dewan Rakyat, Malaysia
Baram River, a river in Malaysia

Other
Baram, a name for the Sacred fig
Baram language, a language spoken in Nepal
Baramue Nara or simply Baram (바람의 나라), Korean game known in the US as Nexus: The Kingdom of the Winds
Baram tteok, a Korean dessert

See also
 Bar'am (disambiguation)
 Kfar Bar'am (disambiguation)